Cheryl Forberg, RD, is a New York Times best-selling author, a James Beard Award-winning chef, and the nutritionist for The Biggest Loser.

Career

Cheryl Forberg began her career with a three-year post as a chef for several Bay Area, California restaurants including Wolfgang Puck’s Postrio Restaurant in San Francisco. She went on to become the private chef for filmmaker George Lucas and his family.

Forberg studied the effects of conjugated linoleic acid on lean body mass at USDA Center for Human Nutrition in San Francisco, after which she became the Research Dietician for Cedars Sinai Hospital in Los Angeles, California, the Health Editor for Cooking.com, and recipe development for the UCLA Department of Clinical Nutrition.

As the nutritionist for The Biggest Loser, Forberg is passionate about helping overweight contestants transform their bodies, health, and ultimately their lives. She has shared cooking and nutrition tips with the contestants for thirteen seasons.

Family life

Forberg lives in Napa, California with her boyfriend.

Books and publications

Cooking with Quinoa For Dummies (Wiley 2013)
Flavor First (Rodale 2011), author
The Biggest Loser Food Journal (Rodale 2010), contributor
The Biggest Loser Six Weeks To A Healthier You (Rodale 2010), author, New York Times bestseller
The Biggest Loser Simple Swaps (Rodale 2009), author, New York Times bestseller
The Biggest Loser 30 Day Jumpstart (Rodale 2009), author, New York Times bestseller
Positively Ageless: A 28-Day Plan to a Younger, Slimmer and Sexier You (2008 Rodale), author
The Biggest Loser Success Secrets: The Wisdom, Motivation, and Inspiration to Lose Weight--and Keep It Off! (2008 Rodale), contributor, New York Times bestseller
The Biggest Loser Fitness Program (2007 Rodale), contributor, New York Times bestseller
The Biggest Loser Complete Calorie Counter (2006 Rodale), author
The Biggest Loser: The Weight Loss Program to Transform Your Body, Improve Your Health, and Add Years to Your Life, contributor/recipe developer (Rodale 2005 New York Times bestseller)
The Perricone Weight-Loss Diet: A Simple 3-Part Plan to Lose the Fat, the Wrinkles, and the Years by Nicholas Perricone MD (Ballantine Books 2005 New York Times bestseller), contributor/recipe developer
The New Mayo Clinic Cookbook (Oxmoor), recipe developer  (2005 James Beard Cookbook Award)
Young for Life: The Best Antiaging Secrets for Women (Oxmoor 2004), contributor to nutrition chapter
The American Medical Association Healthy Heart Cookbook (Meredith Books 2004), recipe developer
Stop the Clock! Cooking: Defy Aging – Eat the Foods You Love (Penguin 2003), author

Professional affiliations

Academy of Nutrition and Dietetics: member
Les Dames d'Escoffier: member
Research Chefs Association: member

Education
Forberg received her culinary education at the California Culinary Academy (CCA) in San Francisco, and her RD (Registered Dietician) credential from the University of California at Berkeley. She also has a bachelor's degree in French from the University of Hawaii at Manoa.

References

Living people
American women writers
American chefs
The Biggest Loser
People from Napa, California
Cuisine of the San Francisco Bay Area
California Culinary Academy alumni
Year of birth missing (living people)
21st-century American women
Chefs from San Francisco